Jantar Mantar is a 1964 Hindi film directed by Radhakant. It starred Mahipal, Vijaya Choudhury and Ulhas. The music for the film was composed by Sardar Malik.

Cast
Mahipal
Vijaya Choudhury
Ulhas
Sheri
Jeevankala
Babu Raje
Mridula Rani

Soundtrack
The music of the film was composed by Sardar Malik with lyrics by Hasrat Jaipuri.

References

External links 
 
 Jantar Mantar songs

1964 films
1960s Hindi-language films
Films scored by Sardar Malik